The Battle of Ebeltoft was a naval battle between a Swedish and a Danish/Dutch fleet, during the Dano-Swedish War of 1658 to 1660. The allied fleet was ordered to secure a troop transport fleet to the Swedish-controlled island Fyn. Eight Swedish frigates under the command of Owen Coxe attacked the fleet and took the allies by surprise. After a long fight one Dutch ship exploded, the rest of the Danish/Dutch ships were captured and the transport fleet was destroyed. The Danish captain was badly wounded and died during the battle. After the battle, Owen Coxe was ennobled under the name Siölöw.

Sources 
Martin Pavón: Søslaget i Ebeltoft Vig, "1001 fortællinger om Danmark"
↑ "Søværnets mærkedage - Juli". Flådens historie. 2008-05-30. Hentet 2011-12-07.
Ulf Sundberg, Hjalmarson and Högberg (1998). Svenska krig 1521-1814

Ebeltoft
Ebeltoft
1659 in Europe
Ebeltoft